Cook County is the easternmost county in the U.S. state of Minnesota. As of the 2020 census, the population was 5,600, making it Minnesota's seventh-least populous county. Its county seat is Grand Marais. The Grand Portage Indian Reservation is in the county.

History
Ojibwe people were early inhabitants of this area. The first non-indigenous people to explore the area were French fur traders, a few of whom settled in the area. By the 1830s, the French population was a few dozen. In the 1830s, settlers began arriving from New England and from upstate New York. Completion of the Erie Canal (1825) and settling of the Black Hawk War (1831) made migration easier.

Most of Cook County's 1830s settlers came from Orange County, Vermont and Down East Maine (modern day Washington County and Hancock County). Most were fishermen and farmers. By 1845 the future Cook County contained 350 people of European descent; by 1874 there were about 2,000. They were primarily members of the Congregational Church, Methodist, and Baptist churches. By 1900 there were about 3,000 people in Cook County.

The first decade of the 20th century saw a large influx of Europeans from Germany, Scandinavia, and Ireland. These waves introduced Lutheranism and Catholicism to Cook County.

The county was created on March 9, 1874. It was named for Territorial and State Senator Michael Cook.

Geography

Cook County is a rugged, heavily wooded triangle of land on Minnesota's northeastern tip. It abuts Canada's southern border and is largely surrounded by the northern end of the Great Lakes. It is heavily dotted with lakes, ponds and streams. The state's highest point is in the county, at 2,301' (701m) ASL. It is Minnesota's second-largest county by area. Lake Superior is at the county's southern border.

Major highways
  Minnesota State Highway 61
  Cook County Road 12 – Gunflint Trail

Adjacent counties
Cook County is in the extreme northeast of the state at the tip of the Arrowhead region; it is adjacent to only one other county by land. Its geographic neighbors are:
 Rainy River District, Ontario Canada - northwest
 Thunder Bay District, Ontario Canada - northeast (EST Border east of the 90th meridian west)
 Lake County - west
 Ashland County, Wisconsin - south
 Keweenaw County, Michigan - east/EST Border
 Ontonagon County, Michigan - southeast/EST Border

Protected areas

 Cascade River State Park
 Grand Portage National Monument
 Judge C. R. Magney State Park
 Kodunce River State Wayside Area
 North Shore State Trail (part)
 Pat Bayle State Forest
 Superior National Forest (part)
 Boundary Waters Canoe Area Wilderness (part)
 Temperance River State Park

Climate

Northern Minnesota offers extreme winter weather. While the averages are low, the extremes provide more details. A third of the year is below freezing (31.9%, 116 days, or 4 months). Of those days, 21 are below zero degrees Fahrenheit (−17.8 °C).

Demographics

2000 census
As of the 2000 census, there were 5,168 people, 2,350 households, and 1,438 families in the county. The population density was 3.56/sqmi (1.37/km2). There were 4,708 housing units at an average density of 3.24/sqmi (1.25/km2). The racial makeup of the county was 89.45% White, 7.59% Native American, 0.33% Asian, 0.29% Black or African American, 0.04% Pacific Islander, 0.25% from other races, and 2.05% from two or more races. 0.75% of the population were Hispanic or Latino of any race. 21.6% were of German, 17.7% Norwegian, 11.5% Swedish, 7.2% Irish and 5.4% English ancestry.

There were 2,350 households, of which 24.4% had children under the age of 18 living with them, 52.0% were married couples living together, 6.1% had a female householder with no husband present, and 38.8% were non-families. 32.5% of all households were made up of individuals, and 10.8% had someone living alone who was 65 years of age or older. The average household size was 2.17 and the average family size was 2.73.

The county population contained 20.4% under the age of 18, 5.4% from 18 to 24, 25.8% from 25 to 44, 31.2% from 45 to 64, and 17.2% who were 65 years of age or older. The median age was 44. For every 100 females there were 99.7 males. For every 100 females age 18 and over, there were 98.5 males.

The median income for a household in the county was $36,640, and the median income for a family was $47,132. Males had a median income of $31,211 versus $23,650 for females. The per capita income for the county was $21,775.  About 8.1% of families and 10.1% of the population were below the poverty line, including 12.2% of those under age 18 and 6.8% of those age 65 or over.

2020 Census

Communities

City
 Grand Marais (county seat)

Census-designated place
 Lutsen

Unincorporated communities

 Croftville
 Grand Portage
 Hovland
 Maple Hill
 Martin Landing
 Mineral Center
 Pigeon River
 Schroeder
 Taconite Harbor
 Tofte

Townships
 Lutsen Township
 Schroeder Township
 Tofte Township

Unorganized territories
 East Cook
 Grand Portage
 West Cook

Ghost towns
 Chippewa City
 Colvill

Government and politics
Cook County has generally voted Democratic. In 88 percent of presidential elections since 1988, the county selected the Democratic nominee. The county was a bellwether in every election from 1916 to 2000, except for 1960, 1976 (by only 16 votes), and 1988 (by only 2 votes). The county was one of the rare white-majority rural counties to have its margin increase for Joe Biden in 2020 relative to Barack Obama's 2012 margin, with 65 percent of voters choosing the Democratic nominee. In both 2016 and 2020, it was the largest county by area in the contiguous states where Trump lost every precinct, although several counties in Hawaii and county equivalents in western Alaska and the northern Panhandle beat it in both elections.

Elections and officeholders

See also
 National Register of Historic Places listings in Cook County, Minnesota

Notes

References

External links
 Cook County Government's website
 Mn/DOT – maps of Cook County (Southwest portion, Eastern portion, Northwest portion)

 
Minnesota counties
1874 establishments in Minnesota
Populated places established in 1874